BI-LO was the name of several different supermarket chains around the world:

 Bi-Lo (Australia)
 BI-LO (United States) in the southeastern United States
 For the Bi-Lo franchise in the northeastern United States, see Penn Traffic

See also
 Bilo (disambiguation)